Ubiquitin carboxyl-terminal hydrolase 48 is an enzyme that in humans is encoded by the USP48 gene.

This gene encodes a protein containing domains that associate it with the peptidase family C19, also known as family 2 of ubiquitin carboxyl-terminal hydrolases. Family members function as deubiquitinating enzymes, recognizing and hydrolyzing the peptide bond at the C-terminal glycine of ubiquitin. Enzymes in peptidase family C19 are involved in the processing of poly-ubiquitin precursors as well as that of ubiquitinated proteins. Alternate transcriptional splice variants, encoding different isoforms, have been characterized.

In melanocytic cells USP48 gene expression may be regulated by MITF.

References

Further reading